The 1994 Cork Junior A Hurling Championship was the 97th staging of the Cork Junior A Hurling Championship since its establishment by the Cork County Board.

The final was played on 23 October 1994 at Páirc Uí Chaoimh in Cork between Carrigtwohill and Barryroe, in what was their first ever meeting in the final. Carrigtwohill won the match by 0-12 to 1-07 to claim a record-equalling fifth championship title overall and a first title in 28 years.

Carrigtwohill's Eoin O'Mahony was the championship's top scorer with 0-15.

Qualification

Results

Quarter-finals

 Barryroe received a bye in this round.

Semi-finals

Final

Championship statistics

Top scorers

Overall

In a single game

References

1994 in hurling
Cork Junior Hurling Championship